Darevsky’s ground skink (Scincella darevskii)  is a species of skink found in Vietnam.

References

Scincella
Reptiles described in 2010
Taxa named by Truong Quang Nguyen
Taxa named by Natalia B. Ananjeva
Taxa named by Nikolai Loutseranovitch Orlov
Taxa named by Evgeny Rybaltovsky
Taxa named by Wolfgang Böhme (herpetologist)